Elias Ricks (born September 26, 2001) is an American football cornerback for the Alabama Crimson Tide. He played for the LSU Tigers before transferring to Alabama in 2022.

Early years
Ricks originally attended Mater Dei High School in Santa Ana, California before transferring to IMG Academy in Bradenton, Florida, for his senior year. As a senior, he had 14 tackles and three interceptions. Ricks was selected to play in the 2020 All-American Bowl. A five-star recruit, he committed to the Louisiana State University (LSU) to play college football.

College career
Ricks was a starter his true freshman year at LSU in 2020. He finished the year with 20 tackles, four interceptions and two touchdowns.

In 2022, Ricks transferred to the University of Alabama and played for the Alabama Crimson Tide before declaring for the 2023 NFL Draft.

References

External links
Alabama Crimson Tide bio
LSU Tigers bio

Living people
People from Rancho Cucamonga, California
Players of American football from California
Sportspeople from San Bernardino County, California
American football cornerbacks
LSU Tigers football players
Alabama Crimson Tide football players
African-American players of American football
21st-century African-American people
IMG Academy alumni
2001 births